Matthis Riou (born 19 January 2001) is a French professional footballer who plays as a centre-back for Guingamp.

Career
A youth product of Tréguier, Riou signed with the youth academy of Guingamp in 2013 and worked his way up their youth teams. He debuted with their reserves in 2020. On 4 June 2021, he signed his first professional contract with the club. He made his professional debut with Guingamp in a 2–0 Ligue 2 loss to Amiens SC on 14 August 2021.

References

External links
 

2001 births
Living people
Sportspeople from Côtes-d'Armor
French footballers
En Avant Guingamp players
Ligue 2 players
Championnat National 2 players
Association football defenders